Tecmo Bowl: Kickoff is an American football video game developed by Polygon Magic and published by Tecmo for the Nintendo DS. A remake of Tecmo Super Bowl, the game was released on November 18, 2008. A Wii version was also announced, but was quietly cancelled and retooled into a new game called Family Fun Football.

Teams
Due to EA Games acquiring the exclusive NFL/NFLPA license for their Madden NFL game series in 2004, the game does not have an NFL license, and use generic names and rosters. However, the game features team cities almost identical to the NFL. The only difference is a Los Angeles team instead of the New York Giants. You can edit the team names, uniforms, and players to your liking.

Wildcat Tecmo Conference (AFC)
East
Buffalo Bullhorns
Miami Fangs
New England Gunners
New York Hardknockers
North
Baltimore Bulldozers
Cincinnati Sinisters
Cleveland T-Rexes
Pittsburgh Poisons
South
Houston Heatwaves
Indianapolis Narwhals
Jacksonville Immortals
Tennessee Tarbenders
West
Denver Spearheads
Kansas City Clashers
Oakland Leviathans
San Diego Supernovas

Bulldog Tecmo Conference (NFC)
East
Dallas Harriers
Los Angeles Supercocks
Philadelphia Vengeance
Washington Volcanics
North
Chicago Chinooks
Detroit Dynamites
Green Bay Barrage
Minnesota Yetis
South
Atlanta Crossfires
Carolina Carnage
New Orleans Zombies
Tampa Bay Warheads
West
Phoenix Horntoads
St. Louis Cannons
San Francisco Zephyrs
Seattle Chavaliers

Features
The game features the following improvements and changes to the original game:

Customizable teams: players are now able to choose team colors, emblems, player names, team cities and abilities
Super abilities: players can use power-ups during the game
Customizable playbook: players are able to choose the plays for each team's playbook
Cutscenes: certain plays cause cinematic representations of the play

The game features Wi-Fi and wireless multiplayer, and utilizes the touch screen and stylus. The game also has updated music and sound effects.

Reception
The game received a 7.7 rating from IGN. It was also a nominee for Best Online Multiplayer Game at IGN's 2008 video game awards.

See also
Tecmo Bowl Throwback

References

External links

2008 video games
Nintendo DS games
Nintendo DS-only games
North America-exclusive video games
Polygon Magic games
Cancelled Wii games
Tecmo Bowl
Multiplayer and single-player video games
Video games developed in Japan